Rodrigo Fernández may refer to:

Rodrigo Fernández (rugby union), Chilean rugby union player
Rodrigo Fernández (footballer) (born 1996), Uruguayan footballer
Rodrigo Fernández de Castro, Castilian nobleman and soldier
Rodrigo Fernandez-Stoll, Canadian actor and comedian